"Sometimes" is a song by Norwegian band Donkeyboy, released as the second single from their debut album, Caught in a Life. It is their second-most-successful single, after "Ambitions". "Sometimes" stayed at top of the Norwegian Singles Chart for a total of eight weeks in 2009.

Chart performance
"Sometimes" debuted at number seven on Norway's VG-lista chart on the 38th chart week of 2009, which corresponds to mid-September. The following week, it rose up to number one, knocking Donkeyboy's previous single, "Ambitions", from the top spot. It kept the position for three weeks before dropping to number six on chart week 42. However, it rose back to number one after two more weeks, once again dethroning "Ambitions". It remained at number one for three more weeks before losing the top position to Rihanna's song "Russian Roulette" for a single week. Returning to number one for the third time on chart week 48, "Sometimes" stayed atop the listing for two final weeks before slipping to number four. Afterwards, it descended the Norwegian chart, dropping out of the top 20 on the ninth week of 2010 before immediately re-entering the top 20 for two additional weeks. It received a triple platinum certification from IFPI Norway in 2010 for selling over 30,000 copies.

Track listings
Digital download and Dutch promo CDR
 "Sometimes" – 3:12

Swedish promo CDR
 "Sometimes (The Jason Nevins Radio Remix) – 3:37
 "Sometimes (The Jason Nevins Club Remix) – 6:08
 "Sometimes (The Jason Nevins Instrumental Club) – 6:11
 "Sometimes (Cosmic Dawn Radio Remix) – 3:57
 "Sometimes (Cosmic Dawn Club Remix) – 5:36
 "Sometimes (Reidar Buskenes & Sean Carros Remix) – 5:45
 "Sometimes (diskJokke Remix) – 7:14
 "Sometimes (Of Norway Version) – 9:55
 "Sometimes (Alex Sayz Remix) – 6:47

Charts

Certifications

References

2009 singles
2009 songs
Donkeyboy songs
Number-one singles in Norway
Songs written by Cato Sundberg
Songs written by Espen Berg (musician)
Songs written by Simen Eriksrud
Warner Music Group singles